The Social Forces Front (FFS) is a Sankarist political party in Burkina Faso.

FFS candidate Norbert Tiendrébéogo ran in the 13 November 2005 presidential election, placing 7th out of 13 candidates with 1.61% of the vote.

At the 2007 parliamentary elections it took part as part of the Union des Parties Sankaristes, UPS. Tiendrébéogo was elected to the National Assembly as a second candidate of UPS.

Political parties in Burkina Faso
Sankarist political parties in Burkina Faso